Emerson Aparecido Leite de Souza Junior (born 14 January 1999), known as Emerson Royal or simply Emerson, is a Brazilian professional footballer who plays as a right-back or a right wing-back for Premier League club Tottenham Hotspur and the Brazil national football team.

Early life
Emerson was born in São Paulo and was raised in Americana, São Paulo. He got his nickname "Royal" as his uncle said he resembled the mascot of the Royal-branded gelatin dessert sold in Brazil.

Club career

Ponte Preta
Emerson joined Ponte Preta's youth setup in 2014, after notably representing Palmeiras, São Paulo and Grêmio. After appearing as an unused substitute in some matches of the 2016 Campeonato Brasileiro Série A, he made his senior debut on 22 February 2017, replacing injured Artur in a 2–2 Campeonato Paulista away draw against Linense. Despite being booked and conceding a penalty, he was given his first start three days later, in a 1–0 home defeat of São Bernardo.

Emerson made his Série A debut on 5 November 2017, replacing injured John Kleber in a 2–0 loss at Bahia. He contributed with three league appearances during the campaign, as his side suffered relegation.

Promoted to the first team ahead of the 2018 season, Emerson became a regular starter for Macaca, making 14 appearances in the 2018 Campeonato Paulista. On 2 April 2018, he scored his first professional goal, the winning one in the Campeonato Paulista do Interior final against Mirassol.

Atlético Mineiro
On 27 April 2018, Emerson signed a five-year deal with Atlético Mineiro, for a rumoured fee of R$5 million. As a part of the deal, Danilo Barcelos moved in the opposite direction on loan.

Emerson made his debut for the club on 19 May 2018, shortly after turning 19, playing the full 90 minutes in a 1–0 win over rivals Cruzeiro. Initially a backup to Patric, he ended the year with 23 league appearances. He scored his first goal in the top tier on 30 September, netting his team's third in a 5–2 home routing of Sport.

Real Betis and Barcelona
On 31 January 2019, Atlético announced the transfer of Emerson to Barcelona, effective as of July 2019, for €12.7 million. The deal consisted of a joint financial operation between Barcelona and fellow La Liga side Real Betis, in which each club paid half of the transfer fee and retained a percentage of Emerson's economic rights. He was to become a Betis player in July 2019, with Barcelona holding the option of reacquiring him for €6 million in 2021. Emerson initially joined Betis on loan from Atlético for the remainder of the 2018–19 season, during which period he made seven appearances for the club. He then became a regular starter for the Andalusians, and scored his first goal abroad on 27 September 2019, but in a 1–5 loss to Villarreal.

On 2 June 2021, Barcelona exercised their option to bring back Emerson for three seasons by paying Betis €9 million.

Tottenham Hotspur
On the final day of the 2021 summer transfer window, Tottenham signed Emerson on a five-year deal for a reported £25.8 million transfer fee. His debut was in the Premier League away to Crystal Palace which Tottenham lost 3–0 on 11 September. On 3 April 2022, he scored his first goal for Tottenham in a 5–1 home win against Newcastle United. On October 1, 2022, during the second half of Tottenham's Premier League away game against Arsenal, Royal received a straight red card for his tackle on Gabriel Martinelli. The team went on to lose 3–1 in the North London derby.

International career
Emerson was called up to the Brazil under-20 team for the 2017 Toulon Tournament. He was the first-choice right-back at the 2019 South American U-20 Championship and the 2019 Toulon Tournament, having won the latter with Brazil's under-23 side.

Emerson made his senior international debut for Brazil on 19 November 2019, coming off the bench in a 3–0 victory over South Korea.

On 11 June 2021, Emerson was called up by manager Tite for the 2021 Copa América. He made his tournament debut on 17 June, playing the last six minutes in a 4–0 thrashing of Peru in Brazil's second group match. Ten days later, he was given his first start as he played the full match in a 1–1 draw in their final group stage match against Ecuador. On 10 July, he played in the final, after coming on in the 76th minute in their 0–1 defeat against Argentina.

Career statistics

Club

International

Honours
Ponte Preta
Campeonato Paulista do Interior: 2018

Brazil U23
Toulon Tournament: 2019
Individual
Toulon Tournament Best XI: 2019

References

External links
Profile at the Tottenham Hotspur F.C. website

1999 births
Living people
Footballers from São Paulo
People from Americana, São Paulo
Brazilian footballers
Association football defenders
Campeonato Brasileiro Série A players
La Liga players
Premier League players
Associação Atlética Ponte Preta players
Clube Atlético Mineiro players
FC Barcelona players
Tottenham Hotspur F.C. players
Real Betis players
Brazil international footballers
Brazil youth international footballers
Brazil under-20 international footballers
Brazilian expatriate footballers
Brazilian expatriate sportspeople in Spain
Expatriate footballers in Spain
Expatriate footballers in England
2021 Copa América players